Ramakant Angle is an Indian Politician from the state of Goa. He was a member of the 13th Lok Sabha. He represents the Mormugao Lok Sabha constituency. He was member of Bharatiya Janata Party but later he joined the Indian National Congress.

References

1972 births
India MPs 1999–2004
Living people
Lok Sabha members from Goa
People from South Goa district
Bharatiya Janata Party politicians from Goa
Indian National Congress politicians from Goa